The siege of Xàtiva was a siege of Xàtiva in the Kingdom of Valencia. It took place between 8 May and 6 June 1707 during the War of the Spanish Succession. Between 9000 and 11000 Castilan and French troops under Philip of Bourbon commanded by Claude François Bidal d'Asfeld and José Antonio de Chaves Osorio faced an Aragonese and British force of about 2,000 under Miguel Purroi and Josep Marco. The Franco-Castilan forces were victorious and the city's defenders were massacred as an exemplary punishment. Most of the rest of the town's inhabitants were deported to the Manche region and the city was burned down and renamed 'San Felipe'. In reference to this episode in their history, Xàtiva's inhabitants are nicknamed 'socarrats' ('grilled people').

Bibliography

Conflicts in 1707
1707 in Spain
Xativa
Xativa
Xativa
Xativa
Xativa
Xativa
Xativa
Sieges of the War of the Spanish Succession